Alamo Bay is a 1985 American drama film about a Vietnam veteran who clashes with Vietnamese immigrants who move to his Texas bay hometown. The film was directed by Louis Malle, and stars Amy Madigan and Ed Harris. Future Texas A&M and Dallas Cowboys linebacker Dat Nguyen, who was aged 9 at the time has a small role as a Little League ballplayer. The film's soundtrack, composed and recorded by the artist Ry Cooder, was released as an album Music From the Motion Picture "Alamo Bay" in the same year, and its title track "Theme from Alamo Bay" can be also found on Music by Ry Cooder, a compilation album of Cooder's soundtracks from movies released between 1980 and 1993.

Plot
A despondent Vietnam veteran in danger of losing his livelihood is pushed to the edge when he sees Vietnamese immigrants moving into the fishing industry in a Texas bay town. He teams up with other fishermen and the KKK to terrorize the Vietnamese fishermen in a campaign of violence and intimidation based on true historical events that took place in Texas in the late 1970s and early 1980s.

Cast
 Amy Madigan as Glory Scheer
 Ed Harris as Shang Pierce
 Ho Nguyen as Dihn
 Donald Moffat as Wally Scheer
 Truyen V. Tran as Ben
 Rudy Young as Skinner
 Cynthia Carle as Honey
 Martin LaSalle as Luis
 William Frankfather as Mac
 Lucky Mosley as Ab Crankshaw
 Bill Thurman as Sheriff

Soundtrack
The music for the film was composed, arranged and performed by Ry Cooder and released as an album, Music From the Motion Picture "Alamo Bay", in 1985. The album's nine tracks were recorded at Ocean Way Studio in Hollywood with a core of credited musicians including drummer Jim Keltner, pianist Jim Dickinson and bassist Jorge Calderon. As four of the tracks were non-instrumental, the album's front cover listed the names of the vocalists: Cooder, David Hidalgo, Cesar Rosas of Los Lobos, Lee Ving, John Hiatt and Amy Madigan.

Reception
In his review, Vincent Canby of The New York Times said "Like many other movies that have their origins in a general idea, which characters and their story, Alamo Bay is almost shamefully clumsy and superficial - it's manufactured 'art.' Watching it is an unhappy experience that never becomes illuminating."

See Also
Vietnamese Fishermen's Association v. Knights of the Ku Klux Klan

References

External links
 
 
 

1985 films
American war drama films
1980s English-language films
Vietnam War films
Films scored by Ry Cooder
Films directed by Louis Malle
1985 drama films
TriStar Pictures films
Films about fishing
Films about immigration to the United States
Films about Vietnamese Americans
1980s American films